Lance Corporal William John House VC (7 October 1879 − 28 February 1912) was a British Army soldier and an English recipient of the Victoria Cross (VC), the highest award for gallantry in the face of the enemy that can be awarded to British and Commonwealth forces.

Background
House was born in Thatcham, near Newbury in Berkshire, on 7 October 1879, the son of Thomas House and his wife, Sally Owen, of Cold Ash adjoining that town.

Details
House was 20 years old, and a private in the 2nd Battalion, The Royal Berkshire Regiment (Princess Charlotte of Wales's), British Army during the Second Boer War when the following deed took place at Mosilikatse Nek, South Africa, for which he was awarded the VC.

Further information
He later achieved the rank of lance corporal. House died on 28 February 1912 whilst cleaning his rifle in an apparent accident.

The medal
The medal is displayed at The Royal Gloucestershire, Berkshire and Wiltshire Regiment Museum, Salisbury, Wiltshire, England

References

Irish Winners of the Victoria Cross (Richard Doherty & David Truesdale, 2000)
Monuments to Courage (David Harvey, 1999)
The Register of the Victoria Cross (This England, 1997)
Victoria Crosses of the Anglo-Boer War (Ian Uys, 2000)

External links
Location of grave and VC medal (Kent)

Dover War Memorial
angloboerwar.com

1879 births
1912 deaths
Military personnel from Berkshire
Second Boer War recipients of the Victoria Cross
Royal Berkshire Regiment soldiers
British recipients of the Victoria Cross
People from Thatcham
British Army personnel of the Second Boer War
Accidental deaths in England
Firearm accident victims
British Army recipients of the Victoria Cross
Burials in Kent
Deaths by firearm in England